Kapadvanj is one of the 182 Legislative Assembly constituencies of Gujarat state in India. It is part of Kheda district.

List of segments 
This assembly seat represents the following segments :

 Kapadvanj Taluka (Part) Villages – Aboch, Abvel, Aghatna Muvada, Alampur, Alawa, Ambaliyara, Antroli, Atarsumba, Bavano Math, Betawada, Bhailakui, Bhoja Na Muvada, Bhungaliya, Bobha, Dadana Muvada, Dahiyap, Dana, Dandiyapur, Dasalvada, Deradi Pavathi, Dhuliya Vasna, Fatiyabad, Fuljina Muvada, Hamirpura, Jagdupur, Jambudi, Jaloya, Kabhaina Muvada, Kalaji, Kapadvanj (M), Karkariya, Kevadiya, Khanpur, Kosam, Kotwalna Muvada, Ladujina Muvada, Lal Mandva, Lalpur, Lalpur (Nirmali), Mahamadpura, Mirapur, Moti Zer, Nani Zer, Narshipur, Nathana Muvada, Navagam, Nikol, Nirmali, Palaiya, Pirojpur, Punadra, Rampura (Sundervadi), Rozavada, Salod, Shihora, Singali, Singpur, Sorna, Sultanpur (Taiyabpur), Taiyabpur, Talpoda, Telnar, Thunchal, Torna, Ukardina Muvada, Vadali, Vaghajipur, Vaghavat, Vasna, Vavna Muvada, Vyasjina Muvada, Vyas Vasna, Zanda

 Kathlal Taluka – Entire taluka ''except villages – Charan Nikol, Fagvel, Fulchhatrapura, Ladvel, Lasundra, Laxmanpura, Porda Fagvel, Sikandar Porda, Vishvnathpura

 Mahudha Taluka (Part) Village – Khandivav

Members of Legislative Assembly 
 1980: Budhaji Chuhan, Indian National Congress
 1985: Budhaji Chuhan, Indian National Congress
 1990: Ratansinh Rathod, Indian National Congress
 1995: Manibhai Devjibhai Patel, Bharatiya Janta Party
 1998: Bimal Shah, Bharatiya Janta Party
 2002: Bimal Shah, Bharatiya Janta Party
 2007: Manibhai Devjibhai Patel, Indian National Congress
 2012: Shankersinh Vaghela, Indian National Congress

Election results

2022

2017

2012

See also 
 List of constituencies of Gujarat Legislative Assembly
 Gujarat Legislative Assembly

References

External links
 

Assembly constituencies of Gujarat
Kheda district